Neurathen Castle, which was first mentioned by this name in 1755, is located near the famous Bastei rocks near Rathen in Saxon Switzerland in the German state of Saxony. This was once the largest rock castle in the region, but today only the rooms carved out of the rock, passages, the cistern and rebates for the timber of the former wooden superstructure have survived. In the years 1982–1984 parts of the extensive castle were used to build the open-air museum.

See also 
 List of castles in Saxony

References

Sources 
 Anne Müller, Matthias Weinhold: Felsenburgen der Sächsischen Schweiz. Neurathen - Winterstein - Arnstein. Reihe Burgen, Schlösser und Wehrbauten in Mitteleuropa Band 23, Verlag Schnell und Steiner, Regensburg 2010, 
 Richard Vogel: Gebiet Königstein Sächsische Schweiz. Reihe Werte unserer Heimat Band 1, Akademie Verlag, Berlin, 2. Auflage 1985

External links 

 Description of Neurathen
 Artist's impression by Wolfgang Braun

Rock castles
Castles in Saxon Switzerland
Castles in Saxony
Rathen
Ruined castles in Germany
Tourist attractions in Saxony